The following lists events that happened in 1946 in Iceland.

Incumbents
President – Sveinn Björnsson
Prime Minister – Ólafur Thors

Events

19 November – Iceland joins the United Nations.

Births

26 April – Vilhjálmur Þórmundur Vilhjálmsson, lawyer and politician
14 May – Sigríður Anna Þórðardóttir, politician.
7 August – Geir Hallsteinsson, handball player
17 September – Helgi Númason, footballer
6 November – Katrín Fjeldsted, politician
9 December – Hermann Gunnarsson, footballer, handball player and media personality (d. 2013).
12 December – Matthías Hallgrímsson, footballer

Deaths

References

 
1940s in Iceland
Iceland
Iceland
Years of the 20th century in Iceland